was a Japanese businessman, the former head of All Nippon Airways. He became President of the company in 1970, one year after becoming vice-president. In 1976, he was imprisoned as a result of a bribery scandal.

After serving time, he regained some honorary status with the company, but withdrew over a dispute with the new president, Seiji Fukatsu.

Wakasa died of pneumonia in 2005.

References 

1914 births
2005 deaths
All Nippon Airways
Deaths from pneumonia in Japan
20th-century Japanese businesspeople
Japanese criminals
People from Toyama Prefecture
University of Tokyo alumni
Lockheed bribery scandals